The Cuejdiu oil field is an oil field located in Gârcina, Neamț County. It was discovered in 2010 and developed by Aurelian Oil & Gas. It will begin production in 2012 and will produce oil.

References

Oil fields in Romania